The Aruba national under-16 basketball team is a national basketball team of Aruba, administered by the Aruba Basketball Bond.

It represents the country in international under-16 (under age 16) basketball competitions.

It appeared at the 2016 CBC U16 Championship.

See also
Aruba men's national basketball team
Aruba men's national under-18 basketball team
Aruba women's national under-17 basketball team

References

External links
Archived records of Aruba team participations

Basketball teams in Aruba
Men's national under-16 basketball teams
Basketball